Andreyevo is a rural locality (a selo) and the administrative center of Andreyevskoye Rural Settlement, Kishertsky District, Perm Krai, Russia. The population was 457 as of 2010. There are 14 streets.

Geography 
Andreyevo is located 13 km west of Ust-Kishert (the district's administrative centre) by road. Karakosovo is the nearest rural locality.

References 

Rural localities in Kishertsky District